The Sun Conference (TSC) is a college athletic conference affiliated with the National Association of Intercollegiate Athletics (NAIA). Seven of the ten full member institutions are located in Florida, with three in Georgia. The Sun Conference competes in the NAIA in all sponsored sports.

History

The conference was created in March 1990 as the Florida Intercollegiate Athletic Conference (FIAC), and renamed to the Florida Sun Conference in 1992.  Charter members consisted of Embry–Riddle Aeronautical University, Flagler College, Florida Memorial University, Nova University of Advanced Technology (now Nova Southeastern University), Palm Beach Atlantic University, Saint Thomas University, Warner Southern College (now Warner University) and Webber International University.

The league later grew to nine members with the addition of Northwood University in 1994 (now Keiser University).  Between 2002 and 2006, Nova Southeastern (2002), Palm Beach Atlantic (2003) and Flagler (2006) moved to NCAA Division II. But the league was able to recruit new members as Savannah College of Art and Design joined in 2004, followed by Edward Waters College in 2006. It adopted its current name in August 2008 to reflect its expansion to institutions outside of Florida.  With the addition of the University of South Carolina at Beaufort in 2008, Johnson & Wales University, Southeastern University and Ave Maria University in 2009, and Thomas University of Georgia in 2012, years, along with Edward Waters’ move to the Gulf Coast Athletic Conference after the 2009–10 season, the league membership stood at 12 schools as of the 2012–13 season.

In 2014, Point University and former member Edward Waters College joined the conference for football only.  Starting with the 2016 season, all six football members moved to the Mid-South Conference for that sport.  Charter member Embry–Riddle Aeronautical University departed the conference on June 30, 2015 and joined the Sunshine State Conference (D-II). In 2017, the College of Coastal Georgia joined the Sun Conference, with the conference again standing at a total of 12 members. In 2018, Sun Conference member Keiser added football but Edward Waters left the Mid-South football league. In 2019, Saint Thomas also added football and Florida Memorial re-added the sport after more than 60 years, bringing the number of members participating in football to 8. 

On June 25, 2020, Johnson & Wales announced it would close down its North Miami campus at the end of the 2020-21 school year, and on July 28, Johnson & Wales North Miami discontinued all sports.

On April 14, 2021, South Carolina–Beaufort reported its invitation to join the Division II Peach Belt Conference in 2022 after applying for membership in, and pending acceptance into, the NCAA. The conference published on December 22 its reinstatement of football for the 2022 season, having grown to seven schools, with Thomas initiating football to become the eighth football member. By July 15, 2022, USCB was already accepted into the Continental Athletic Conference, formerly the Association of Independent Institutions, only for the first of its three-year NCAA provisional membership but with a Peach Belt schedule as part of the Sand Sharks' dual NAIA-NCAA membership.

On July 1, 2022, Thomas announced that they will leave the conference and they will join the Southern States Athletic Conference (SSAC), starting in the 2023–24 academic year. They will remain in the Sun Conference as an affiliate member for football from that day forward.

Chronological timeline
 1990 - In March 1990, the Sun Conference was founded as the Florida Intercollegiate Athletic Conference (FIAC). Charter members included Embry–Riddle Aeronautical University–Daytona Beach, Flagler College, Florida Memorial University, Nova University of Advanced Technology (now Nova Southeastern University), Palm Beach Atlantic University, Saint Thomas University, Warner Southern College (now Warner University), and Webber International University, effective beginning the 1990-91 academic year.
 1992 - The FIAC has been rebranded as the Florida Sun Conference, effective in the 1992-93 academic year.
 1994 - Northwood University–Florida joined the Florida Sun, effective in the 1994-95 academic year.
 2002 - Nova Southeastern left the Florida Sun and the NAIA to join the Division II ranks of the National Collegiate Athletic Association (NCAA) and the Sunshine State Conference (SSC), effective after the 2001-02 academic year.
 2003 - Palm Beach Atlantic left the Florida Sun and the NAIA to join the NCAA Division II ranks as an NCAA D-II Independent, effective after the 2002-03 academic year.
 2004 - Savannah College of Art and Design at Savannah joined the Florida Sun, effective in the 2004-05 academic year.
 2006 - Flagler left the Florida Sun and the NAIA to join the NCAA Division II ranks as an NCAA D-II Independent, effective after the 2005-06 academic year.
 2006 - Edward Waters College (now Edward Waters University) joined the Florida Sun, effective in the 2006-07 academic year.
 2008 - The Florida Sun has been rebranded as The Sun Conference, effective in the 2008-09 academic year.
 2008 - The University of South Carolina at Beaufort joined the Sun Conference, effective in the 2008-09 academic year.
 2009 - Ave Maria University, the Florida campus of Johnson & Wales University (Johnson and Wales–Florida) and Southeastern University joined the Sun Conference, effective in the 2009-10 academic year. Ave Maria joined as an associate/provisional member.
 2010 - Edward Waters left the Sun Conference to join the Gulf Coast Athletic Conference (GCAC), effective after the 2009-10 academic year.
 2012 - Thomas University joined the Sun Conference, effective in the 2012-13 academic year.
 2014 - Point University joined the Sun Conference as an affiliate member for football (with Edward Waters re-joining), effective in the 2014 fall season (2014-15 academic year).
 2015 - Embry–Riddle left the Sun and the NAIA to join the NCAA Division II ranks and the SSC, effective after the 2014-15 academic year.
 2015 - Northwood–Florida left the Sun Conference as the school announced that it would close, effective after the 2014-15 academic year. However, Keiser University purchased the location, therefore it has inherited everything Northwood–Florida had sponsored (including its athletic program) and joined the Sun Conference, effective in the 2015-16 academic year.
 2017 - Point and Edward Waters left the Sun Conference as affiliate members for football, effective after the 2016 fall season (2016-17 academic year).
 2017 - The College of Coastal Georgia joined the Sun Conference, effective in the 2017-18 academic year.
 2020 - Johnson and Wales–Florida left the Sun Conference as the school announced that it would close, effective after the 2019-20 academic year.
 2022 - South Carolina–Beaufort (USCB) left the Sun Conference to join the Continental Athletic Conference, in addition to the NCAA Division II ranks and the Peach Belt Conference (PBC), effective in the 2022-23 academic year. USCB will leave the CAC and the NAIA after that school year to focus on the Peach Belt and the NCAA.
 2022 - Thomas (Ga.) announced that they will leave the Sun Conference and they will join the Southern States Athletic Conference (SSAC), effective beginning the 2023-24 academic year.

Member schools

Current members
The Sun currently has 10 full members, all but two are private schools. Departing members are highlighted in pink.

Notes

Current affiliate members
In 2021, the conference added the University of Mobile, St. Andrews University, Truett McConnell University, and William Carey University as affiliate members for beach volleyball. Loyola of New Orleans also participates in beach volleyball.

In 2022, Life University began participating in Men's Swimming, Women's Swimming, and Women's Lacrosse.

Former members
The Sun had seven former full members, most are private schools, one is public, and another is defunct:

Notes

Former affiliate members
The Sun had two former affiliate members, both were private schools:

For the 2014 and 2015 football seasons, Edward Waters and Point joined the conference.  All six members moved to the Mid-South Conference for the 2016 season.  With the exception of Point, which participates in the Appalachian Division, these teams plus Faulkner University now form the Sun Division of the Mid-South Conference.

Notes

Membership timeline

Sports

References

External links